J'ai faim !!! (I'm hungry !!!) is a 2001 French comedy film directed by Florence Quentin.

Plot 
The day she receives an inheritance from her uncle, who is seriously ill in the hospital, Lily hurts her back having sex with her partner. The following day, she learns that he is leaving her for his assistant, a beautiful young woman. Lily, aided by her friends and her caretaker, does everything she can to get back her Toto.

Cast 
 Catherine Jacob as Lily
 Michèle Laroque as Arlette
 Garance Clavel as Yolande
 Isabelle Candelier as Corinne
 Alessandra Martines as Anaïs Pommard
 Yvan Le Bolloc'h as Barnabé
 Stéphane Audran as Gaby
 Julien Guiomar as Guyomard
 Serge Hazanavicius as Jean-René
 Valérie Decobert-Koretzky as Sonia
 Sophie Tellier as Claire
 Edith Perret as Madame Savart
 Thierry Métaireau as Jérôme
 Philippe Cotten as Alain
 Jean-Louis Richard as Doctor Montalembert 
 Jean Dell as Barnabé's client

References

External links 

2001 films
2001 comedy films
French comedy films
2000s French films
2000s French-language films